Aniqah Gaffoor (born 23 January 2004) is a Sri Lankan swimmer.

Life
She was born in 2004. While she was at school at the United World College Thailand her training schedule started at 4:30 in the morning on every day but Sundays.

In 2019, she represented Sri Lanka at the 2019 World Aquatics Championships held in Gwangju, South Korea. She competed in the women's 50 metre butterfly and women's 100 metre butterfly events. In the same year, she also won one silver medal and one bronze medal at the 2019 South Asian Games.

In 2021 it was announced that she would be going to the postponed 2020 Summer Olympics in Tokyo.

References

External links
 

Living people
2004 births
Place of birth missing (living people)
Sri Lankan female swimmers
Female butterfly swimmers
South Asian Games silver medalists for Sri Lanka
South Asian Games bronze medalists for Sri Lanka
South Asian Games medalists in swimming
Swimmers at the 2020 Summer Olympics
Olympic swimmers of Sri Lanka